U.S. Route 285 (US 285) is the section north-south highway in Colorado that starts at the New Mexico state line and ends at I-25, US 87, and SH 30 in Denver.

Route description

Heading north from the Colorado border, US 285 passes through the main part of the San Luis Valley, eventually reaching Alamosa.  As the highway heads north, it begins to ascend to the northern end of the valley and eventually climbs over Poncha Pass, elevation , and drops sharply down the other side into the Arkansas River Valley.

The highway brushes Salida and follows the Arkansas River north up the valley, then takes a sharp eastward turn just before the small town of Buena Vista. 285 then climbs over Trout Creek Pass, elevation , and enters the high-altitude South Park basin.

A few miles north, the highway passes through Fairplay and the historic South Park City site, then reaches its highest elevation: , at the summit of Red Hill Pass.  US 285 then leaves the South Park basin and climbs over Kenosha Pass, elevation , and skirts the south side of the Mount Evans massif as it descends its way through the foothills range towards Denver.

As the highway leaves the Rocky Mountains and reaches Denver's southwest suburbs, it becomes Hampden Avenue, an important artery in the Denver metro area, then reaches its northern terminus at I-25.

On March 14, 2008 both houses of the Colorado legislature, in a unanimous vote, named the section between Kenosha Pass and C-470 the Ralph Carr Memorial Highway.

History
The short segment between US 50 at Salida and US 24 at Buena Vista closely parallels the original U.S. Route 650, which was designated in 1926, but eliminated in 1936 when US 285 was commissioned along its present extent from Sanderson to Denver, mostly replacing state-numbered highways.

Between Bailey and Como, US 285 mostly follows the route of the Denver, South Park and Pacific Railroad, part of the original narrow gauge transcontinental railroad.

Gallery

Junction list

References

External links

 Colorado
85-2
Transportation in Conejos County, Colorado
Transportation in Alamosa County, Colorado
Transportation in Rio Grande County, Colorado
Transportation in Saguache County, Colorado
Transportation in Chaffee County, Colorado
Transportation in Park County, Colorado
Transportation in Jefferson County, Colorado
Transportation in Arapahoe County, Colorado
Transportation in Denver